Hengersberger Ohe (in its upper course: Ranzinger Bach) is a river of Bavaria, Germany. It flows into the Danube in Winzer.

See also
List of rivers of Bavaria

References

Rivers of Bavaria
Rivers of Germany